The 1982 Rhode Island gubernatorial election was held on November 2, 1982. Incumbent Democrat J. Joseph Garrahy defeated Republican nominee Vincent Marzullo with 73.30% of the vote.

General election

Candidates
Major party candidates
J. Joseph Garrahy, Democratic
Vincent Marzullo, Republican 

Other candidates
Hilary R. Salk, Citizens
Peter Van Daam, Independent

Results

References

1982
Rhode Island
Gubernatorial